"Weird Science" is a song by Oingo Boingo. Written by frontman Danny Elfman, it is the theme song to the Weird Science film and television series. It was released on the film's soundtrack, as well as Oingo Boingo's 1985 album, Dead Man's Party, as a longer mix. The song reached #45 on the US Billboard Hot 100, #21 on the US Dance Club Charts, and #81 in Canada. It is Oingo Boingo's most successful single.

Recording
The song was written spontaneously by Elfman in the car, while driving home to Los Angeles, after a phone call from director John Hughes asking him to write a song for his movie of the same name. Elfman claimed to have "heard the whole thing in [his] head" by the time he ran home to his studio to record his demo.

Music video
The music video for "Weird Science" features the band performing in an abstract laboratory. The video appeared in a number of different edits when broadcast, some featuring clips from the John Hughes film and other versions without. Elfman later expressed embarrassment at the video, stating that he was "horrified" by the outcome and that it was the only Oingo Boingo music video in which he had not been involved with production. Elfman had long felt that the song, a more commercial musical style than most of the band's previous releases at the time, was "not really a part of [the band's] repertoire". The video would later be parodied on TV show Beavis and Butt-Head, at which point Elfman claimed he decided he "never [wanted] to play this song again!"

Usage in media 

 1990, Volkswagen TV commercial 
 1994, Beavis & Butt-head “SCIENTIFIC STUFF” - Snippets of the “Weird Science” video is shown, while the due make fun of it. Butthead dislikes it because he believes “this guy (Danny Elfman) thinks he’s smart”, while Beavis dislikes it because he thinks “college music sucks”. They switch the channel.
 2022, NIKE TV commercial, featuring top footballers such as, Mbappe, Ronaldinho and Cristiano Ronaldo.

Track listing

7" Single
 "Weird Science" (3:45)
 "Weird Mama" (2:50) by Ira and the Geeks

12" Single
 "Weird Science [Extended Dance Version]" (6:38)
 "Weird Science" (3:45)

12" Promo Single
 "Weird Science [Weird Dub Bonus Beats]" (6:00)
 "Weird Science [Boingo Dance Version]" (5:38)
 "Weird Science [Extended Dance Version]" (6:38)

Charts

See also
 Weird Science (TV series)
 Weird Science (film)

References

1985 songs
Oingo Boingo songs
Film theme songs
Comedy television theme songs
Songs written by Danny Elfman
MCA Records singles
Songs written for films